Omer Peretz (born 30 March 1990) is an Israeli footballer who plays for F.C. Ironi Ariel. In the beginning of his career he played for Maccabi Netanya F.C. in the upper league.

Honours
Liga Alef - South (1):
2009-10

External links

1990 births
Living people
Israeli Jews
Israeli footballers
Footballers from Rosh HaAyin
Maccabi Netanya F.C. players
Hapoel Herzliya F.C. players
Hapoel Ramat Gan F.C. players
Sektzia Ness Ziona F.C. players
Maccabi Jaffa F.C. players
Hapoel Tel Aviv F.C. players
Hapoel Nir Ramat HaSharon F.C. players
Hapoel Bik'at HaYarden F.C. players
Tzeirei Tayibe F.C. players
Israeli Premier League players
Liga Leumit players
Israeli people of Moroccan-Jewish descent
Association football forwards